These are the official results of the Women's 110 metres hurdles event at the 1999 IAAF World Championships in Seville, Spain. There were a total number of 42 participating athletes, with six qualifying heats, four quarter-finals, two semi-finals and the final held on Saturday August 28, 1999, at 20:05h.

Medalists

Final

Semi-final
Held on Friday 1999-08-27

Quarter-finals
Held on Thursday 1999-08-26

Heats
Held on Wednesday 1999-08-25

References
 IAAF
 YouTube

H
Sprint hurdles at the World Athletics Championships
1999 in women's athletics